The  is a rapid transit line of Sendai Subway in Sendai, Japan. It connects Izumi-Chūō Station in Izumi-ku, Sendai, with Tomizawa Station in Taihaku-ku, Sendai. Like many mainline trains and metros in Japan, it uses the 1067 mm track gauge and runs on 1,500 V overhead line. The name "Namboku" means south–north, which is the general direction that the track runs.

The Namboku Line was the world's first public railway to use fuzzy logic to control its speed. This system (developed by Hitachi) accounts for the relative smoothness of the starts and stops when compared to other trains, and is 10% more energy efficient than human-controlled acceleration.

Stations

History

1981 – Construction started
July 15, 1987 – Line opened from Yaotome to Tomizawa.
July 15, 1992 – Line extended from Yaotome to Izumi-Chūō.
March 11, 2011 – Damaged in the 2011 Tōhoku earthquake and tsunami and subsequently shut down for repairs.
April 29, 2011 – Line reopens after repair works were finished.

Rolling stock
 1000 series 4-car EMUs

See also
 List of rapid transit systems

References

External links

 Sendai City Transportation Bureau Home Page 
 Urban Rail article on Sendai Subway 

 
Railway lines opened in 1987
1987 establishments in Japan
1067 mm gauge railways in Japan
Transport in Sendai
1500 V DC railway electrification